Sang Sarak is a village in Birun Bashm Rural District, Kelardasht District, Chalus County, Mazandaran Province, Iran. At the 2006 census, its population was 166, in 45 families.

References 

Populated places in Chalus County